Warmbad may refer to:

Warmbad, Namibia, a settlement in southern Namibia.
Bela Bela, a town in South Africa previously named and still commonly called Warmbad.